Qılqılov (also, Qılqlov, Gel’glov, and Gylglov) is a village and municipality in the Lerik Rayon of Azerbaijan.  It has a population of 291.

References 

Populated places in Lerik District